Rukometni klub Rudar is a handball club in Pljevlja, Montenegro.

Trophies
Champion of the Sandzak 3 times!
Now Club to compete in a mini league for Champions.

Current squad

Famous players
Nenad Perunicic, Predrag Perunicic, Boban Knezevic, Goran Cmiljanic ( www.rkskipper.com ), Radan Rovcanin

Famous Coaches
Radan Rovcanin
first coach of HC Rudar Pljevlja. Originated in the club. After an excellent player career, he coach for three years. Two years in Italy and now in Rudar. He was born in Pljevlja 09.05.1971. www.rkrudar.co.me

External links
Handball Federation of Montenegro
balkan-handball

Pljevlja
Pljevlja

www.rkrudar.co.me